This is a part of the list of tallest structures in the world, past and present of any type.

This list includes quite a few masts. A mast is a man-made support structure, commonly used on sailing ships as support for sails, or on land as radio masts and towers used to support telecommunication equipment such as radio antennas ("aerials" in the UK).

Other parts are:

 List of tallest structures in the world
 List of tallest structures in the world - 300 to 400 metres

See the first part for terminology and general introduction.

List by height 
 indicates a structure that is no longer standing.
 indicates a guyed mast.

Structures (past or present) between 450 and 500 m (1,476 and 1,640 ft)

Structures (past or present) between 400 and 450 m (1,312 and 1,476 ft)

See also
 List of European medium wave transmitters
 List of tallest bridges
 List of tallest buildings and structures
 List of tallest structures built before the 20th century
 List of tallest dams
 List of tallest freestanding structures
 List of transmission sites
 Radio masts and towers

References

External links
 World Federation of Great Towers
 Skyscrapers diagrams and forum
 Skyscrapers database
 Search for Radio Masts and Towers in the U.S.

400 to 500 metres
Towers
Guyed masts
Lists of construction records